Epitoxis ceryxoides is a moth of the subfamily Arctiinae. It was described by Emilio Berio in 1941 and is found in the Democratic Republic of the Congo.

References

 Arctiidae genus list at Butterflies and Moths of the World of the Natural History Museum

Arctiinae
Moths described in 1941
Endemic fauna of the Democratic Republic of the Congo